Francis Rugge (1535 – 18 October 1607), of Norwich, Norfolk, was an English politician.

He was a Freeman, Norwich 1563, alderman from c.1570, sheriff 1572-3, and Mayor of Norwich 1587-8, 1598-9 and 1602-3.

Francis Rugge was the 4th son of Robert Rugge (d.1559), Mayor of Norwich, by Elizabeth, daughter of Robert Wood of Norwich, gentleman of the horse to Charles Brandon, Duke of Suffolk. His uncle was William Rugge, Bishop of Norwich, and his brother was John Rugge (d. February 1581/2), Achdeacon of Wells.

He married Anne (d. 23 May 1611), daughter of John Aldrich (by 1520–1582) by Elizabeth, daughter of Nicholas Sotherton, alderman of Norwich, on 14 June 1561 at St. Clement's Church, Norwich. Anne had previously been the wife of Nicholas Bacon (d.1560). Nicholas Bacon and Anne Aldrich had been married on 19 February 1559 in the same church. The entry for their marriage is a couple of entries above the entry for that of Francis and Anne. Anne's first husband was buried at St. Clement's Church, Norwich on 20 of November 1560. His entry is a couple of entries above the one for the burial of Anne and Francis's infant son. It was Francis who inherited his father’s position as a Norwich mercer. In his father's will he was left two manors and some money and plate, and he was appointed one of the executors of said will. His father passed away in 1559.

According to Norwich Heritage:The couple had no children. They lived in a house built 1470 - 90 on land at the corner of Bridewell Abbey and St Andrew's Street. An inner entrance of the house has been preserved at the Telephone Exchange in St Andrew's Street.Two children were baptised to Francis Rugge and Anne Aldrich:

 Robert, baptised on 12 July 1562 at St. Clement's Church, Norwich, buried on 21 July 1562 at St. Clement's Church, Norwich
 Jone, a daughter, baptised in January 1563/4 at home by the midwife, buried on 22 January 1563/4 at St. George Colegate, Norwich, Norfolk, England.

The couple's monument survives, and is located in the same chapel as the monuments of Robert Suckling, also a Norwich politician, and his son Sir John Suckling, who was knighted in 1616 and served as Secretary of State to both James I and Charles I.

At the east end wall, on the northernmost part, St. Mary's chapel  in St. Andrew's Church, Norwich, there is an inscription which reads:Hic prope Patricio RUGGORUM sanguine cretus

FRANCISCUS recubat, qui septaginta duosque,

Per-vivens annos, isti ter præfuit Urbi,

ANNA que ab Aldricijs quæ progeneratur avitis,

Hujus FRANCISCI nuper fidissima conjux,

Condidit hunc Tumulum recubantis honore Mariti.

Obijt Ille die xviii° Mensis Octobris A° Dni. 1607.

Obijt Illa die xxiii° Mensis Maij 1611.

A Senator of Senators renowned Race,

Was FRANCIS RUGG, now intombed in this Place,

He was thrice Mayor in 72 Years Life,

ANN, being by birth an Aldrich late his Wife,

In Love hath reared this Memorial,

To celebrate his worthy Name withal.

The Rugge coat of arms, Gules, a chevron engrailed, between three mullets pierced, argent, can be seen on this monument, though the chevron does not appear to be engrailed. Francis Blomefield, Rector of Fersfield in Norfolk, however, confirms this to be the coat of arms of Rugge in his An Essay Towards A Topographical History of the County of Norfolk: Volume 4, Containing the History of Norwich, Part II. This coat of arms quarters, 1st, Argent, a chevron engrailed between three pairs of keys erect, addorsed azure, Mynshawe; 2nd, arg. a chevron ingrailed sab. between three birds. 3rd, Ermine, a chief indented gules, Brome. There is a crescent for difference. The said quartered coats impale Aldrich, on a fesse bull passant, and there is a shield of Aldrich single.

Of the other coats of arms the Rugge coat of arms is quartered with, Argent, a chevron, between three birds (martlets), sable, appears to be the coat of arms of his mother's Wood family.

This quartering could indicate a Mynshawe and a Brome heiress in Francis Rugge's ancestry, which marriages are now lost to time.

References

Mayors of Norwich
Sheriffs of Norwich
1535 births
1607 deaths